Events from the year 1911 in Sweden

Incumbents
 Monarch – Gustaf V
 Prime Minister - Arvid Lindman, Karl Staaff

Events

 27 April – The film Stockholmsfrestelser by Anna Hofman-Uddgren, the first movie by a female director in Sweden.
June – The Sixth Conference of the International Woman Suffrage Alliance is held in Stockholm.
Date unknown – The Swedish Cross-Country Skiing Association is renamed the Swedish Ski Association.

Births

 15 January – Gösta Bohman, politician  (died 1997)
 5 February - Jussi Björling, operatic tenor (died 1960)

Deaths
 28 January – Wilhelmina Fundin, operatic soprano (died 1819) 
 8 February – Gustaf Fröding, poet and writer (born 1860) 
 10 March - Elsa Eschelsson, first woman to finish a Doctor of Laws  (born 1861) 
 8 May - Rosalie Fougelberg, dentist (born 1841) 
 7 October - Hilda Lund, ballerina (born 1840)

References

 
Years of the 20th century in Sweden
Sweden